Serhiy Vovkodav (born 2 July 1988) is a Ukrainian professional football defender who plays for FC Poltava in the Ukrainian First League.

Playing in the youth competitions of the Ukrainian Premier League in 2006–2013, on 27 May 2021 retained its record with the most games in competitions among under-21 teams.

References

External links 
 Official Website Profile
 Profile on EUFO
 Profile on Football Squads

1988 births
Living people
People from Lubny
Ukrainian footballers
FC Vorskla Poltava players
FC Kremin Kremenchuk players
Ukrainian Premier League players
FC Mariupol players
FC Poltava players
Association football defenders
Sportspeople from Poltava Oblast